Jonathan Hall may refer to:

Jonathan Hall (basketball), British wheelchair basketball player
Jonathan Hall (British Army officer) (born 1944)
Jonathan Hall (cricketer) (born 1962), English cricketer
Jonathan Hall (cyclist) (born 1972), Australian cyclist and triathlete
Jonathan Hall (sport shooter) (born 1988), American sport shooter
Jonathan C. Hall, Iowa Supreme Court justice
Jonathan M. Hall, professor of Ancient Greek History at the University of Chicago
Jonathan Hall KC, the current Independent Reviewer of Terrorism Legislation

See also
Jon Hall (disambiguation)